Darreh Gavmish (also Romanized as Darreh Gāvmīsh) is a village in Bazoft Rural District, Bazoft District, Kuhrang County, Chaharmahal and Bakhtiari Province, Iran. At the 2006 census, its population was 21, in 4 families.

References 

Populated places in Kuhrang County